The SNCF Class Z 7500 are electric multiple units that were built by Alsthom in 1982–83.

Alstom multiple units
Z 07500
Electric multiple units of France